Angela Lee Hazeldine (born 2 July 1981 in Colwyn Bay, Wales) is a Welsh actress and musician, known for portraying Gemma Craig in the Channel 5 soap opera Family Affairs.

Background
Actor James Hazeldine was a cousin of Hazeldine's father. She is the niece of Stephen Moore and a cousin of Robyn Moore and Sam Hazeldine.

Career

Acting
Hazeldine played the role of Gemma Craig in Family Affairs for four years. She has also guest starred in episodes of Kavanagh QC, Heartbeat, The Royal Today and Doctors. She made her feature film debut in Kapital, a 2007 collaboration between writer/director Greg Hall and composer Steve Martland. She is also to appear in Hall's next film, Same Shit, Different Day.

Music
Hazeldine sings and plays keyboards in Manchester-based band the Circus Electric, with Sam Stockman on guitar and lead vocals. They started after the demise of Shepherd's Pi, a band formed while she was working on Family Affairs and included co-stars Sam Stockman and Rupert Hill.

From 2019 Hazeldine is the lead singer in Manchester-based band Secluded Sea, with songwriter and ex Twisted Wheel (band) drummer Blair Murray.

Filmography

References

External links

1981 births
Living people
People from Colwyn Bay
Welsh television actresses
Welsh soap opera actresses
Welsh film actresses
21st-century Welsh women singers